Hettie Morse Chute (1888-1962) was an American-Canadian botanist and professor of botany at Rutgers University.

References 

1888 births
1962 deaths
American women scientists
American botanists
Rutgers University faculty
American women academics
Canadian emigrants to the United States